The Saint Kitts and Nevis national basketball team is the national men's basketball team from Saint Kitts and Nevis, governed by the St. Kitts Amateur Basketball Association.

Current roster
At the 2006 FIBA CBC Championship:

|}

| valign="top" |

Head coach

Assistant coaches

Legend

Club – describes lastclub before the tournament
Age – describes ageon 13 June 2006

|}

References

Men's national basketball teams
B
1979 establishments in Saint Kitts and Nevis
Basketball